U.S. Città di Palermo played the season 2004-05 in the Serie A league. It was the first time Palermo entered the top division since 1973.

Review and events

Palermo returned to Serie A in 2004 as Serie B champions. Francesco Guidolin was confirmed at the helm of the rosanero and a number of valuable signings were made in the summer market: among them, Andrea Barzagli, Cristian Zaccardo, Simone Barone (all three then part of the Italian squad that won the 2006 FIFA World Cup) and Argentines Mariano González and Ernesto Farías. The team was widely expected to be a candidate for a mid-table place because of the high quality of its roster. All these events provoked a notable excitement among the local fanbase, leading to a sale of over 30,000 season tickets which caused each Stadio Renzo Barbera seat to be assigned to a season ticket holder.

Palermo enjoyed a great start and quickly entered into the race for a UEFA Cup spot, ending the first half of the season in fifth place, only three points behind fourth-placed Inter. For a while the team appeared also capable to fight for a place in the next Champions' League, but failed in do so and Udinese eventually gained the last of the four available spots. Palermo ended in sixth place with 53 points, nine behind Udinese and eight behind fifth-placed Sampdoria. After the final match, Guidolin tended his resignations, and Luigi Delneri was quickly appointed at his place.

In the Coppa Italia tournament, the rosanero reached the round of 16 after having defeated Salernitana 3-2 on aggregate. The return match notably marked the only two goals by Argentine striker Ernesto Farías, who failed to impress in the Italian top league and was sold to River Plate in the January transfer window. In order to replace him, Davide Possanzini was signed by from AlbinoLeffe. Palermo then went on to be defeated 4-1 on aggregate by AC Milan.

2004-05 squad

|-
|colspan="12"|Players sold or loaned out during the January transfer market:

|}

January transfer market bids
In

Out

Results

Serie A

Matches

Coppa Italia

References 

Palermo F.C. seasons
Palermo